St Pius X College (abbreviated as Pius) is an independent Catholic primary and secondary day school for boys, located in Chatswood, a lower North Shore suburb of Sydney, New South Wales, Australia. The school was established by the Congregation of Christian Brothers in 1937 and is operated under the auspices of Edmund Rice Education Australia. Oversight of the school is provided by the Catholic Education Office of the Diocese of Broken Bay. Located in the heart of the Chatswood central business district, the school is close to Westfield Shopping Centre and Chatswood railway station.

In 2005, the College was ranked 101st in New South Wales for the Higher School Certificate marks, up from 108th the previous year. More recently, in 2013, the school again improved its rank to 73. It is a member of the Independent Schools Association (ISA) and the Junior School Heads Association of Australia.

The college operates as two separate schools: the "Junior School" catering for boys in Years 5 and 6, and the "Senior School" catering for boys in Years 7 to 12.

History

St Pius X College started in 1937 as Christian Brothers Chatswood, initially going to the Beginner level, with the first Leaving Certificate class graduating in 1941.

St Pius X College used to be a co-educational school, partnered with Mercy College, however during the 20th century the partnership ended and each school became single sex.

A major improvement in the 1990s was the development of Oxford Falls as an educational complex. Named the Treacy Centre, the facility comprises a variety of sports fields and venues as well as a number of meeting places and classrooms. In the late 1990s the college undertook extensive renovations and rebuilding. Later, during the late 2000s a new building was built, it included meeting rooms, stands, basketball courts and can facilitate stage plays (Pius Talent Show).

Fide et Labore is written on the shield, which is Latin for "By Faith and Labour". In 2011, John Couani became the first lay person to be principal of the school.

The college has recently implemented an E-Learning program, which provides students with personal learning devices, specifically the Microsoft Surface Pro 6 across the school. These computers act as learning aids and hold student text books.

Extra-curricular activities

Sport
The school participates in rugby, cricket, football, basketball, tennis, softball, swimming, squash, chess and athletics.

Debating and public speaking
The college also participates in debating and public speaking. It is a member of the Catholic Schools Debating Association, the largest debating competition for schools in New South Wales and has since 2015 participated in the Sydney Debating Network. It enters students into the Legacy Youth Public Speaking and Plain English Speaking Competitions annually. In 2015 the 11 A debating team were runners up in the CSDA debating competition and were awarded the prestigious Aggregate Senior shield for winning the most debates out of any school in the competition. Following this in 2016 the 12 A team were Grand Final winners of the CSDA Senior Opens debating competition winning the Michael Robson Shield as champions of the Senior Competition.

Music

Music has also always been a large part of extracurricular involvement at St Pius. The various bands include concert bands, jazz bands and guitar ensembles. In order to gain entry to any band, a student must audition. In order to gain access to the Senior Jazz Band and Senior Concert Band, genChouirerally a high level of skill is required in the instrument of which a student plays. 

The bands and choir often play for the school as well at the Twilight Concert held every term. The twilight concert generally begins with the choir. After the choir have performed, the ensembles usually play next and after which, the Jazz and Concert Bands begin to play. The school has also recently been involved with competitive hissing but no words on a performing group as of yet.

Performing Arts is an integral part of the College curriculum and students at St Pius X have every opportunity to make the performing arts an involved part of their lives, through participation in many different types of music and drama activities.

Robotics

St Pius X College has the largest active robotics club in Australia with over 100 members. The school's robotic club takes part in robotics competitions. The two major annual competitions are the RoboCup and FIRST LEGO League. The club consists of members from years five through to twelve. Acceptance is usually granted through the robotics lessons held in class during Year Five, however, entry to the club in later years can also be granted through applying directly to the robotics coordinator.

Outdoor education 

St Pius's Outdoor Education program facilitates personal development and teamwork through camps, excursions and overnight experiences. Outdoor Education is offered to all students, these experiences enhance learning, build relationships and respect, develop leadership and teamwork, as well as resilience as boys overcome fear and adversity as they push outside their comfort zones. Connection with nature also provides a platform for spiritual growth and experience.

Highlights of the Outdoor Education Program include:

 Milson Island camp (Year 5)
 Camp Wombaroo (Year 6)
 The Great Aussie Bush Camp (Year 7)
 Ski trip (Year 8)
 Workul Koo Terrigal (Year 9)
 Immersions to Walgett and Bowraville (Year 10)
 Snowy Hike (Year 11, the 100 km 6-day trek is a 30 + year tradition at the College)
 Bush Retreat to Tallow Beach (Year 12)
 Duke of Edinburgh practice hikes and expeditions
 Kokoda preparation
 Warrumbungles expedition

Mock trial

Students in Year 11 have the opportunity of entering the Mock Trial Competition conducted by the Law Society of New South Wales. During the competition the College's 'legal team' competes against other schools defending and prosecuting 'mock' cases involving assault, larceny, and negligence. Students take on the roles of barristers, clerks, court officers, magistrates, solicitors, and witnesses.

Notable alumni

 Jackson BirdAustralian cricket player for the Tasmanian Tigers and the Hobart Hurricanes
 Josh Duinkerprofessional basketball player

 Ben Fordhamjournalist and broadcaster, Nine Network and 2GB
 Peter Fricker former CEO Australian Institute of Sport
 Des Haslerformer rugby league footballer and coach of the Canterbury-Bankstown Bulldogs and Manly Warringah Sea-Eagles
 Michael Hooperrugby union footballer for the |Wallabies and Waratahs
 Peter InghamAuxiliary Bishop of Sydney 1993–2001; Bishop of Wollongong 2001–present
 Luke Jonesrugby union footballer for the Melbourne Rebels
 David Kilcullenstrategist and counterinsurgency expert

 Pat Mulroney Industrial Adventurer
 Martin Plazafounding member, vocalist and guitarist of Mental As Anything

 Greg Sheridan foreign affairs editor, The Australian newspaper
 Peter ThompsonABC TV presenter
 James Tuckerrugby union footballer
 Timm van der Gugtencricket player for Netherlands, the Tasmanian Tigers and the Hobart Hurricanes
 John Watkins former Deputy Premier of New South Wales, Minister for Transport, and Minister for Finance
 Francis Webbpoet

See also

 List of non-government schools in New South Wales
 List of Christian Brothers schools
 Catholic education in Australia

References

External links
 
 Diocese of Broken Bay

Catholic primary schools in Sydney
Educational institutions established in 1937
Catholic secondary schools in Sydney
Congregation of Christian Brothers secondary schools in Australia
Boys' schools in New South Wales
Junior School Heads Association of Australia Member Schools
Independent Schools Association (Australia)
Chatswood, New South Wales
1937 establishments in Australia
Congregation of Christian Brothers primary schools in Australia